Omulonga is a constituency in the Ohangwena Region of northern Namibia. It had 27,772 inhabitants in 2004 and 13,585 registered voters . The constituency office is located at Onamukulo, along the Ondobe-Oshigambo district road.

The constituency is sharing boundaries with Ondobe Constituency on the North, Oshana Region on the South, Eenhana Constituency on the Eastern part and Endola Constituency on the West. It contains the settlements of Onandova, Okaonde, Onaihenda, Ombalamumbwenge, Esaati, Onangwe, Oshali, Ohaukelo, Onashali, Omakondo, Omokolo, Ohepa, Onailonga and Onamukulo.

Politics
As is common in all constituencies of former Owamboland, Namibia's ruling SWAPO Party has dominated elections since independence. 

It won the 2015 regional election by a landslide. Its candidate Erickson Ndawanifa gathered 5,785 votes, while the only opposition candidate, Jona Thomas of the Rally for Democracy and Progress (RDP), received 140 votes. Councillor Ndawanifa of SWAPO was reelected in the 2020 regional election. He received 5,102 votes, far ahead of Lazarus Nangolo of the Independent Patriots for Change (IPC), an opposition party formed in August 2020, who obtained 833 votes.

References 

Constituencies of Ohangwena Region
States and territories established in 1992
1992 establishments in Namibia